Wouters is a Dutch patronymic surname, meaning son of Wouter, and corresponding to Walters in English. In 2007/2008 there were about 8700 people in the Netherlands and 15700 people in Belgium with that name. People with this name include:

Ad Wouters (born 1944), Dutch sculptor active in Belgium
Aloïs Wouters (born 1962), Belgian racing cyclist
Cas Wouters (born 1943), Dutch sociologist
Dries Wouters (born 1997), Belgian football defender
Enzo Wouters (born 1996), Belgian racing cyclist
Frans Wouters (1612–1659), Flemish painter
G. Henry Wouters (1802–1872), Flemish church historian
Hendrina Wouters (1718–1746), Dutch murderer
Hugo Wouters (1931–1975), Flemish poet with the pseudonym "Hugues C. Pernath"
Jan Wouters (born 1960), Dutch football midfielder
Jan Wouters (legal scholar) (born 1964), Belgian legal scholar
Jean de Wouters (1905–1973), Belgian inventor and aerodynamics engineer
Jean Claude Wouters (born 1956), Belgian dancer, film maker and painter
Josee Wouters (fl. 1947), Belgian table tennis player
Joseph Wouters (born 1942), Belgian racing cyclist
 (born 1981), Dutch badminton player
Leon Wouters (1930–2015), Belgian football defender and coach
Liliane Wouters (1930-2016), Belgian poet, playwright, anthologist and essayist
Lode Wouters (1929–2014), Belgian racing cyclist
Michaelina Wouters (ca. 1620–after 1682), Flemish painter
Rik Wouters (1882-1916), Belgian painter and sculptor
Rolf Wouters (born 1963), Dutch television show host
 (born 1996), Dutch racing cyclist
Stefan Wouters (born 1972), Belgian visual artist and curator
Thierry Wouters (born 1979), Belgian swimmer
Veerle Wouters (born 1974), Belgian politician
Wayne Wouters (born 1951), Canadian Clerk of the Privy Council

See also
Wauters, homonymic surname
Wouters v Algemene Raad van de Nederlandse Orde van Advocaten, European Court of Justice decision concerning competition law

References

Dutch-language surnames
Patronymic surnames
Surnames of Belgian origin
Surnames of Dutch origin